Gowlallo is a town in the north-central Mudug region of Somalia.

References
Gowlallo

Populated places in Mudug
Galmudug